Mimi Thebo is an American author who lives and works in the United Kingdom. Her most recent and most successful books have been for children. Dreaming the Bear has been nominated for the 2017 Carnegie Medal named as a 'future classic' by Booktrust and long listed for the 2017 UKLA award. Dreaming the Bear was published by Oxford University Press in the UK in 2016 and would be later published by Wendy Lamb in the USA in 2017.

Previous books have included Wipe Out, which was Sunday Times Book of the Week and was adapted for the BBC into a BAFTA Award-Winning film by Barabara Cox. Wipe Out was published in 2002 by HarperCollins, and has been recommended for children suffering from grief by the Marie Curie Trust.

References

External links 

 

American women novelists
British women novelists
Year of birth missing (living people)
Living people
Place of birth missing (living people)
21st-century American novelists
21st-century British novelists
21st-century American women writers